Leïla Aouchal (born Liliane Hélène Roberte Constantin; 13 July 1936 – 21 April 2013) was a French-Algerian writer.

Life 
She was born to a middle-class French family in Caen, France, in 1936, and married an Algerian immigrant at the age of 19, moving with him to Algeria. Upon the country's 1962 achievement of independence, Aouchal became an Algerian citizen.

Despite being raised as a Catholic, she gradually became "Algerianized"; she began to read the Koran, converted to Islam and avoided Christian festivals in Algeria. Aouchal died in Gonesse in 2013.

Works 
In 1970, Aouchal published Une Autre Vie, an autobiographical account of her experience of integrating into Algerian society amidst a civil war. This would be her only work.

Despite her brief writing career, she was cited as being included in the first generation of female Algerian writers using the French language (along with such names as Fadhma Aït Mansour and Taos Amrouche). These individuals were born between 1882–1928, publishing their texts between 1960–1980. Common themes are the "self-discovery" of the authors, with texts set during the Algerian War and the evolution of the female condition during this time in the country.

References 

20th-century French writers
French autobiographers
French emigrants to Algeria
Algerian women writers
Algerian writers
1936 births
2013 deaths
20th-century French women writers
Women autobiographers
21st-century Algerian people
Converts to Islam from Catholicism
Algerian Muslims
French Muslims
Muslim writers